Yoheved "Veda" Kaplinsky (born March 23, 1947 in Tel Aviv, British Mandate of Palestine [now Israel]) is a lecturer and professor of music at the Juilliard School. She heads the Pre-College department at Juilliard.

Education 
She studied piano under Ilona Vincze-Kraus at the Israel Academy of Music (now the Buchmann-Mehta School of Music) and earned her bachelor, master, and doctoral degrees from the Juilliard School as a student of Irwin Freundlich.  She continued her studies with Dorothy Taubman.

Professional career 
She began her teaching career at Philadelphia University of the Arts and then taught at the Manhattan School of Music in 1987. Between 1989 and 1997 she taught at the Peabody Conservatory in Baltimore.

In 1993, she began to teach at the Juilliard School. She became the chairperson of the Piano Division in 1997.

For many years, she was a Professor of Piano in the Texas Christian University School of Music and was a member of the faculty at the Aspen Music Festival and School.

Interviews

See also
 Thirteenth Van Cliburn International Piano Competition

References and external links 

The Juilliard School
Van Cliburn TV

References

1947 births
American classical pianists
Aspen Music Festival and School faculty
Israeli classical pianists
Jewish American classical musicians
Juilliard School alumni
Juilliard School faculty
Living people
Texas Christian University faculty
Jewish classical pianists
20th-century American pianists
21st-century classical pianists
20th-century American women pianists
21st-century American women pianists
21st-century American pianists
American women academics
21st-century American Jews